Jules Payot (10 April 1859 - 30 January 1940) was a French educationist.

Career overview
Payot was born in 1859 in Chamonix.  Little is known about his education and academic career; however some sources presents him as a leading figure in lay education and in 1907 he was appointed rector at the Aix-Marseille University in Aix-en-Provence. Payot died in 1940.

According to a summary of minutes taken by the secretary of the faculty at the Ecole Normale, Payot presented his candidacy to the vacant chair in Pedagogy previously held by Professor Ferdinand Buisson. The chair eventually was granted to Émile Durkheim, who was noted as being mainly a sociologist, but the electing council argued that pedagogy was a subject within sociology. Payot received ten votes in the first poll, thereby losing to Malapert, who in turn lost to Durkheim.

Among his most famous books are Éducation de la volonté which in 1909 had been published in no less than 32 editions and subsequently translated into several languages. "La Educación de la Voluntad" traducida al español de la cuarta edición francesa, por Manuel Antón y Ferrándiz; Editorial Daniel Jorro, Madrid calle de la Paz 23, cuarta edición del año 1922.  Juan Lasi

Quotes 
"Une foule n’est accessible qu’à des émotions, elle est incapable d’une attitude d’esprit objective." — A crowd is accessible only to emotions, it is unable of an objective attitude of spirit.
From La Conquête du Bonheur/The Conquest of Happiness

"La plupart attrapent une opinion comme on attrape la rougeole, par contagion." — The majority catch an opinion as one catches measles, by contagion.
From La Faillite de l’Enseignement/The Bankruptcy of Teaching

Bibliography 
 (1895). Éducation de la Volonté.
 (1908). La Morale à l'École. 
 (1914). L'Apprentissage de l'Art d'Écrire.
 (1921). Le Travail Intellectuel et la Volonté: Suite à "L'Éducation de la Volonté".
 (1921). La Conquête du Bonheur.
 (1937). La Faillite de l'Enseignement.

Works in English translation
 (1909). Education of the Will, Funk & Wagnalls Company.
 (1919). "Military Service and Self-Control." In French Educational Ideals of Today, World Book Company.
 (1921). Will-power and Work, Funk & Wagnalls Company.
 (1924). The Conquest of Happiness, Funk & Wagnalls Company.

References
  Spanish edition in possession of Prof. Juan Lasi  Florida U.S.A

Further reading
 Chambrun, Marquis de (1910). "The French Bishops and the Education Problem," The Dublin Review, Vol. CXLVI.
 Sabatier, Paul (1913). "Moral Instruction in the School." In France Today: Its Religious Orientation, E. P. Dutton & Co.
 Tyrrell, Mary Ignacita (1940). A Comparison of the Ideas of Jules Payot and Johann Lindworsky, S.J. on the Training of the Will, Catholic University of America.

External links

 
 Works by Jules Payot, at Hathi Trust

1859 births
1940 deaths
French educational theorists
People from Chamonix